Sergio Almaguer Treviño (born 16 May 1969) is a Mexican former professional footballer who played as a centre-back, who is the current assistant manager of Liga MX club Monterrey. Almaguer made his professional debut with the former Mexico club Ángeles de Puebla on May 16, 1987. Almaguer played with nine different clubs in Mexico and Turkey and also capped for the Mexico national team.

Career
Almaguer started his career with former club Ángeles de Puebla, where he played 27 games and scored three goals. After one season with Angeles he transferred to Puebla, spending three seasons with the team. After the 1989–90 season Almaguer transferred to Querétaro, he appeared in 35 games and scored 11 goals. Between 1991 and 1996 Almaguer played for Tigres UANL (included the relegation during the 1995-96 season), he also played on loan for Correcaminos UAT for the 1994–95 season. For the Invierno 1996 season turned to a defender after playing as a striker for the first nine years of his career. In his first season playing at defense, Almaguer played with Puebla, he played in 35 games and scored just two goals.

After playing with Puebla, Almaguer was transferred to Necaxa for the Invierno 1997 season. His tenure with Necaxa was successful, he was champion in the Invierno 1998 season and won the 1999 CONCACAF Champions' Cup. After four years playing with Necaxa he signed with Cruz Azul where he spent two years appearing in 37 games. He was loaned to Galatasaray of the Turkey Süper Lig for one year, he only appeared in seven league matches, three UEFA Champions League matches and scored no goals. After half a season in Turkey he returned to Mexico, he signed with Chiapas. On June 28, 2005, Almaguer announced his retirement ending his 18-year career.

Coaching career
On February 20, 2008, Almaguer was named coach of his former team, Jaguares de Chiapas. Almaguer made his debut three days later against Tecos UAG, Jaguares won 2–0. He led the team to six victories, two draws and three losses to end the season. In the first round of the postseason, Jaguares defeated Cruz Azul 1–0 in the first leg. In the second leg Cruz Azul won 2–1 and won on aggregate 2–2 because Cruz Azul was a higher seed. After losing five of the first 10 games of the Apertura season Jaguares fired Almaguer.

Mexico U-17
On July 26, 2010, Almaguer coached his first Mexico's U-17 game against Ireland's U-17, resulting in a 1–1 draw.

Mexico U-20
In January 2015, Almaguer won the 2015 CONCACAF U-20 Championship in Jamaica with the Mexico U-20 team also qualifying them for the 2015 FIFA U-20 World Cup in New Zealand. In December 2015, Almaguer was released from his duties with the Mexico U-20 national team.

Managerial statistics

Managerial statistics

Honours

Player
Puebla
Mexican Primera División: 1989–90
Copa México: 1989–90
Campeón de Campeones: 1990

Tigres UANL
Copa México: 1995–96

Necaxa
Mexican Primera División: Invierno 1998
CONCACAF Champions' Cup: 1999

Manager
Mexico U20
CONCACAF U-20 Championship: 2013, 2015

References

External links
 
 

1969 births
Living people
Mexico international footballers
Footballers from Nuevo León
Sportspeople from Monterrey
Mexican expatriate footballers
1999 Copa América players
2000 CONCACAF Gold Cup players
Tigres UANL footballers
Club Puebla players
Club Necaxa footballers
Cruz Azul footballers
Querétaro F.C. footballers
Galatasaray S.K. footballers
Liga MX players
Süper Lig players
Chiapas F.C. footballers
Correcaminos UAT footballers
Expatriate footballers in Turkey
Chiapas F.C. managers
Association football defenders
Mexican football managers
Querétaro F.C. non-playing staff
C.D. Guadalajara non-playing staff
Club América non-playing staff
Mexican footballers